Ptychoceratodus is an extinct genus of lungfish living from Early Triassic to Middle Jurassic. It was established by Otto Jaekel for one species (P. runcinatus), transferred from Ceratodus genus. Type species is P. serratus from the Middle Triassic of Switzerland and Germany. Ptychoceratodus had two pairs of massive dental plates, bearing 4-6 acute ridges. Its skull roof was composed from massive, plate-like bones. In the central part of skull roof was localized an unossified fenestra. Most of the Ptychoceratodus findings are isolated dental plates, some associated with jaws. Other parts of skull or postcranial skeleton are relatively rarely found as fossils. The anatomy of skull is the best recognized in P. serratus, whereas less complete cranial material is available also for P. concinuus, P. phillipsi, and P. rectangulus. Although Ptychoceratodus is known exclusively from the Triassic and Jurassic, there were also Cretaceous specimens referred to this genus. However, they are more often regarded as representants of Metaceratodus.  Ptychoceratodus is the only member of the family Ptychoceratodontidae. The first named species is P. phillipsi by Louis Agassiz in 1837 as a species of Ceratodus and later moved to Ptychoceratodus genus. Occurrences of Ptychoceratodus come mainly from Europe. However, occurrences from other continents suggest it was dispersed globally during the Triassic. After 2010, the new fossil material behind the Europe was reported from South America, India, and Greenland

Fossil distribution 
Fossils of Ptychoceratodus have been found in:

Triassic
 Burgersdorp Formation, (Cynognathus Assemblage Zone), Early Triassic (Olenekian), South Africa (?Ptychoceratodus sp.)
 Lipovskaya Formation, Early Triassic (Olenekian), Russia (P. donensis)
 Erfurt Formation, Middle Triassic (Ladinian), Germany (P. serratus)
 Weser Formation, Carnian, Germany (P. concinnus)
 Tiki Formation, Carnian, India (P. oldhami)
 Marnes de Châlins Formation, Norian France (P. rectangulus)
 Löwenstein Formation, Alaunian (Norian), Germany (P. rectangulus)
 Grès à Avicula contorta Formation, Rhaetian, France (P. phillipsi)
 Fleming Fjord Formation, Norian, Greenland (P. rectangulus)
 Grabowa Formation, Carnian, Poland (P. roemeri)

Jurassic

 Inferior Oolite Group, Middle Jurassic, England (P. phillipsi)

See also 
 Sarcopterygii
 List of sarcopterygians
 List of prehistoric bony fish

References 

Prehistoric lobe-finned fish genera
Early Triassic first appearances
Olenekian genera
Ladinian genera
Carnian genera
Norian genera
Rhaetian genera
Tithonian genera
Maastrichtian genera
Late Cretaceous genus extinctions
Triassic animals of Africa
Prehistoric fish of Africa
Triassic fish of Europe
Jurassic fish of Asia
Late Cretaceous fish of South America
Fossils of Argentina
Triassic Argentina
Cañadón Asfalto Basin
Fossils of China
Fossils of France
Fossils of Germany
Fossils of India
Fossils of Russia
Fossils of South Africa
Fossils of Thailand
Fossil taxa described in 1926